Pennsylvania Fields, Sedbury is a  biological Site of Special Scientific Interest in Gloucestershire, notified in 1985.

The site is listed in the 'Forest of Dean Local Plan Review' as a Key Wildlife Site (KWS).

Location and use
The fields are in the Forest of Dean, near Sedbury, and are brackish pasture which overlies alluvia soil.  They lie adjacent to the lower, tidal part of the River Wye, and are unique in Gloucestershire. The area is made up of a collection of fields which are crossed by rhines and water-filled ditches.  This pastureland, which is flooded by spring tides (the Wye being a tidal river), is traditionally grazed in the summer months.

Flora
Mud rush, meadow barley, red fescue, marsh foxtail and the nationally rare bulbous foxtail flourish in the pasture. There is a variety of saltmarsh plants such as sea arrowgrass, sea milkwort, sea aster, greater sea-spurrey, and lesser sea-spurrey. The rare narrow-leaved marsh dandelions (Taraxacum palustre and T. anglicum) are also recorded. Where areas become marshy grassland other species are found.  The drainage ditches support a separate range of plants. The brackish water-crowfoot (Ranunculus baudotii) may be found at the boundaries of some of the fields.

Fauna
Redshank and lapwing breed on the site. Several species of damselfly flourish along the draining ditches include the azure damselfly.

References

External links
 Natural England (SSSI information)
 Natural England SSSI information on the citation
 Natural England SSSI information on the Pennsylvania Fields, Sedbury units

Sites of Special Scientific Interest in Gloucestershire
Sites of Special Scientific Interest notified in 1985
Tidenham